Yuri Schukin was the defending champion but decided to compete in the Fürth Challenger instead.
Florian Mayer won the title by defeating Jan Hájek 7–6(7–1), 3–6, 7–6(7–3) in the final.

Seeds

Draw

Finals

Top half

Bottom half

External Links
 Main Draw
 Qualifying Draw

UniCredit Czech Open - Singles
2012 Singles